Aida Husić Dahlen (born 5 October 1990) is a Norwegian para table tennis player, she is currently world number two in her sports class 8. She competed at the 2020 Summer Paralympics, in Women's individual class 8, winning a bronze medal.

Life 
Dahlen was born without a left forearm and has a below-knee amputation on her left leg. Dahlen was born in Bosnia and Herzegovina before the outbreak of the Bosnian War in 1992. She was adopted by Norwegian parents at the age of six.

She took up table tennis at the age of 12 after being encouraged by a friend, and first competed internationally in 2008 at the age of 18.

References

External links
 Aida Dahlen at ITTF Para Table Tennis
 
 

1990 births
Living people
Bosnia and Herzegovina emigrants to Norway
Sportspeople from Oslo
Table tennis players at the 2012 Summer Paralympics
Table tennis players at the 2016 Summer Paralympics
Table tennis players at the 2020 Summer Paralympics